Bargur is a selection-grade town panchayat in the Krishnagiri district of the Indian state of Tamil Nadu, that serves as the headquarters of Bargur taluk, one of the seven taluks in Krishnagiri district.

History
The town panchayat of Bargur was created on 1 November 1969 and was upgraded to a selection grade town panchayat on 14 February 1985.

Geography
State Highway 131 begins in Bargur and runs southeast to Tirupattur.

Demographics
As of 2011, there were 3,760 households in Bargur, which had a total population of 16,366 people. 8,316 (50.8%) of the population were male, while 8,050 (50.2%) were female. 1,810 children, about 11.1% of the town's population, were at or below the age of 6. 1,939 people in the town, about 11.8% of the population, were classified as Scheduled Castes or Scheduled Tribes. 70.9% of the population were literate.
The official language of Bargur is Tamil, although Kannada and Telugu are also spoken, with Telugu speakers making up the plurality of the town's population as of 2001. In 2001, there were 6,621 Telugu speakers, 5,209 Tamil speakers, and 2,250 Kannada speakers in the town.

Politics
Bargur is part of Bargur state assembly constituency, represented by D. Mathiyalagan of the DMK party. Bargur is part of Krishnagiri Lok Sabha constituency, which is represented in by A. Chellakumar of the Indian National Congress.

References

Cities and towns in Krishnagiri district